The 1955–56 Temple Owls men's basketball team represented Temple University during the 1955–56 NCAA men's basketball season. The team was led by head coach Harry Litwack and played their home games at The Palestra in Philadelphia, Pennsylvania. Playing out of the East region, the Owls made a run to the Final Four of the NCAA tournament – the first in program history. In the National semifinals, Temple lost to Iowa. The Owls bounced back to defeat SMU in the consolation game to finish with a record of 27–4. It would be the second time in three seasons Temple reached the Final Four and took third place.

Roster

Schedule and results

|-
!colspan=9 style=| Regular season

|-
!colspan=9 style=| NCAA Tournament

Rankings

Awards and honors
 Hal Lear – All-American

Team players drafted into the NBA

References

Temple Owls men's basketball seasons
Temple Owls
NCAA Division I men's basketball tournament Final Four seasons
Temple
Temple
Temple